Pharmahuasca is a pharmaceutical version of the entheogenic brew ayahuasca. Traditional ayahuasca is made by brewing the MAOI-containing Banisteriopsis caapi vine with a DMT-containing plant, such as Psychotria viridis. Pharmahuasca refers to a similar combination that uses a pharmaceutical MAOI instead of a plant. 

N,N-DMT and harmaline or harmine are typically used as components of pharmahuasca. As a rule, the fewer the β-carbolines, the less nausea; the more DMT, the more spectacular the visions. The constituents are put into separate gelatin capsules. The capsules with harmaline/harmine are swallowed first and the capsules containing DMT are taken 15 to 20 minutes later. A synthetic MAOI can be used in place of harmaline and harmine, although caution must be taken when choosing an MAOI. The use of moclobemide, a reversible inhibitor of monoamine oxidase-A (RIMA), has been recorded and is safer than older irreversible MAOIs (such as isocarboxazid) due to its significantly shorter and more selective effects (although it still exhibits a wide range of dangerous drug-drug interactions).

See also
Alkaloid
Entheogen
Ayahuasca

External links
Erowid: Ayahuasca
A General Introduction to Ayahuasca

References

Polysubstance combinations
Psychedelic tryptamine carriers
Ayahuasca